The Changzhou dialect (Simplified Chinese: 常州话; Traditional Chinese: 常州話; IPA: [z̥ɑŋ.tsei.ɦu] (pronunciation in the Changzhou dialect)), sometimes called Changzhounese, is a dialect of Wu, a Sino-Tibetan language family, and belongs to the Taihu dialect group. It is spoken in the city of Changzhou and surrounding areas in Jiangsu province of China. It has many similarities with the Shanghainese and Suzhou dialect. It is not at all mutually intelligible with Mandarin, China's official language. It is much more closely related to the neighboring Wuxi dialect with which it is mostly mutually intelligible.

Phonetically, the Changzhou dialect makes use of a number of voiced or slack voiced initials  that are not found in Mandarin as well as a larger number of vowel sounds . The tone system also is of greater complexity, using 7 tones based on the classical tonal system. It also has a more complex tone sandhi than found in most other Chinese varieties.

Changzhou dialect is the representative of the small dialect in the northernmost part of the Wu dialect area and the Jianghuai mandarin dialect area. Influenced by the dialect habits, Changzhou Mandarin presents its own characteristics that are different from standard Mandarin in terms of pronunciation. Mr. Zhao Yuanren was the first person who used modern linguistic methods to study Changzhou dialect, and especially made a pioneering and outstanding contribution to the research on Changzhou dialect phonetics. In the early 20th century and even earlier, gentleman's talk and streets appeared in Changzhou city When talking about Changzhou dialect with two accents, the people who use it are different. The two accents have similarities in common, but also have distinct distinctive features.

Geographic distribution
The Changzhou dialect is centered around the city of Changzhou and is spoken throughout the prefecture. It is notable as being one of the last places one hears Wu when traveling West before it gives way to the Southern Mandarin dialects, with the possible exception of the Gaochun dialect spoken in Southern Nanjing county.

Within the prefecture, there are also small but noticeable distinctions in pronunciation between the city center and the more rural surroundings which can be easily detected by native speakers. It is likely that as most residents have remained in the same village for many generations and have been locally educated these variations have managed to persist.

As one travels closer to Wuxi, the dialect begins to be closer to that spoken in neighboring Wuxi, the dialect of Wu that is most closely related to the Changzhou dialect. Speakers from the eastern Changzhou villages have little difficulty conversing fluently with those from the western end of Wuxi Prefecture.

In addition to the surrounding areas of Jiangsu Province, Changzhounese is also emerging as a spoken dialect in Shanghai, and overseas in New York City in the United States.

Development

Influence of Lin'an Mandarin on Wu Dialect 
The Lin'an Mandarin (Hangzhou Mandarin) has had an important influence on the Wu dialect area. The Nandu of the Song Dynasty had an important influence on the dialects of Zhejiang, especially along the Qiantang River and its upper reaches. In these areas, there is still a reading system called "Zhejiang Mandarin" by the locals, which has played a role in the regional common language. The Song Dynasty moved south to Hangzhou, and the northern mandarin entered the Wu dialect area and formed a new level; Changzhou, Suzhou, Shanghai and other places changed the voicing of the Wu dialect due to the influence of the Lin'an Mandarin.

Investigation and Recognization Changzhou dialect phonology 
Mr. Zhao Yuanren is the first person to conduct in-depth and detailed investigations on the phonetics of Changzhou dialect and sort out the phonetic system of Changzhou dialect, because it was born with the birth of "The Study of Modern Wu Dialect". Mr. Zhao described the Changzhou dialect system three times. For the first time, in October 1927, Mr. Zhao Yuanren organized a survey of Wu dialects, and his hometown Changzhou dialect was included in 33 survey points. Published "Seventeen Examples of Musical Tones in Changzhou Poetry", the beginning of which listed the tones, initials and finals of Changzhou dialect; the third time, in January 1968, at the appointment of the American Oriental Society, he wrote the article "Changzhou Dialect" , published in 1970, English version. It had three publications, although the time span is large, the focus is different, and the presentation methods are also different, the research conclusions are very uniform in nature, because the speaker is Mr. Zhao himself for the second time, and the object of the first pronunciation is a 35-year-old teacher, the same age as Mr. Zhao. Mr. Zhao has lived abroad for a long time, so his Changzhou dialect has not "advanced with the times", and always maintains the original style. Zhao's Changzhou dialect has 7 single-character tones, 30 initials and 45 finals.

Gently Talk and Street Talk 
The words of "gently talk" and "street talk" in Changzhou dialect can be found in the dialect survey and records of Changzhou dialect made by international language master Mr. Zhao Yuanren in the early 20th century.

The distinction between "gentle talk" and "street talk" appeared earlier. It is not clear when the differentiation began, because the earliest relevant record seen so far is Mr. Zhao's "Research on Modern Wu Dialects". Presumably, this distinction already existed in the Qing Dynasty - Mr. Zhao was talking about gentry since he was a child.

"Gently talk" and "street talk" use different groups of people. Gentry is also called squire's dialect, squire's talk, etc. As the name suggests, it was the words spoken by the gentlemen in the countryside at that time. In the late period of Chinese feudal society, especially in the Qing Dynasty, Changzhou enjoyed the reputation of "the important support of Wujin and the famous capital of Bayi", with convenient commerce and trade, leading economy, prosperous humanities, and prosperous academics. When people arrived in Changzhou, they became a wealthy family in Changzhou and an urban upstart with a rural accent. When Mr. Zhao Yuanren's great-grandfather moved his family to Qingguo Lane, his descendants settled here. Qingguo Lane is another place where officials and gentry gather in Changzhou. The squires who live in these places all say something called "gentle talk". The source of gentry talk is probably the crepe crepe passed down from generation to generation by the families of officials and giants. The street talk is the authentic Changzhou accent, the accent of the local ordinary citizens, and the accent of most people in the city.

The main difference between gentle talk and street talk is the tone of voice. The difference between gentle talk and street talk is concentrated on one point - the difference in monograms. There are 7 tones in Changzhou dialect. According to Mr. Zhao Yuanren’s investigation and description, the differences in the tones of Changzhou dialects between gentry and street talk are as follows: First, the yin rise value is different. The gentry yin rise value is 55; The upward adjustment value is 35, the difference is subtle but sensitive; second, the second voice is the upper voice, the street talk should be the (yin) upper voice of 35, the gentleman's talk is the text reading (yin) of the upper voice of 55, and the vernacular should be the yangping of 73.

Phonetics and phonology

Initials

Finals 

Note2:
The original tables

Tones

Like a number of other Wu dialects, the Changzhou dialect is considered to have seven tones. However, since the tone split dating from Middle Chinese still depends on the voicing of the initial consonant, these constitute just three phonemic tones. The seven tonic allophones were divided according to register by the Chinese-American linguist and Changzhou native Yuen Ren Chao. The high register includes the first, third, fourth and sixth tone with the second, fifth and seventh tone in the low register.

Tone sandhi
Sandhi in Wu dialects is complex compared to Mandarin, though Changzhou sandhi is not nearly as complex as that of the Suzhou dialect of Wu.

Examples

Four-Character Idioms 
The common idioms in Changzhou dialect are: phrases with fixed structure and overall semantics, which are passed down orally by the people of Changzhou and used in the Changzhou dialect area. The idioms in the dialect have a strong dialect color. Only those who have lived in a certain dialect area for a long time can use it freely, like a fish in water; otherwise, they do not understand its meaning, or seem to understand it.

挨肩擦背(Shoulder to Shoulder): crowded

壁跟壁落(Walls and Walls): every corner

别咧卜落(Don't be fooled): one after another, non-stop

七搭八搭(Compatible with each other): describe the speech as being out of focus

测测默默(Quietly): silently

搭七搭八(Take seven and eight): casually strike up a conversation with people, and the relationship is ambiguous

搭头搭脑(Head-to-head and head-to-head): total before and after

得溜滚圆(Gotta be round): very round

滴沥笃落(Drip drop): the sound of light rain, also refers to the flow of water is not smooth

暗忽隆冬(Darkness and Midwinter): Dark, not bright ......

Influence 

The influence of Changzhou dialect on Changzhou mandarin is mainly concentrated in the following two aspects. First, both Yangping and Qusheng in Mandarin tend to be yin people's voices. The end point or starting point of the tone change of Mandarin Yangping (tone value 35) and Qusheng (iJt value 51) is 5, while the tone value of Changzhou Yinren tone is 5. These three tones are easily confused in speech flow. Due to the influence of the dialect habits, Changzhou people are very easy to pronounce the Yinren yin in the dialect with the pronunciation of the Mandarin, so there is a phenomenon that some Mandarin yangping and Qusheng characters are pronounced as yin jinxuan, such as "that is即, but却, "shu束" are very easy to be pronounced as yin people's voices. Second, the sound of Mandarin tends to be Yangping. The tone value of Mandarin is 214, and the tone value of Changzhou dialect is 213. The two tone types are very similar. At the same time, the characters in the Yangping tone of Changzhou dialect are basically Yangping tone in Mandarin, which makes it easy for Changzhou people to compare it with Changzhou dialect. The upper tone of Mandarin, which is very similar to the Yangping tone, is related to the Yangping tone of Mandarin.

The influence of Changzhou dialect on the pronunciation of Changzhou Mandarin belongs to a special linguistic phenomenon produced by the contact and fusion of dialect and national common language.

See also
List of Chinese dialects
Suzhou dialect
Shanghainese
Wu dialects

Notes

References

Sheng, Yimin (2022-07-05). "宋室南渡與臨安官話對吳語的影響 – 若干詞彙、語法的例證 (Influence of the southern migration of the Song Dynasty on Wu dialects via Lin'an Guanhua : Lexical and syntactic evidence)". Language and Linguistics. 語言暨語言學: 439–472. DOI:10.1075/lali.00016.she. ISSN 1606-822X. Retrieved 2022-10-10.

Jin, Lizao (2011-6). "赵元任与常州方言语音研究 (Zhao Yuanren and Changzhou Dialect Phonetics Research)". Journal of Changzhou Institute of Technology(Social Science Edition). Vol. 29 No.3. ISSN:1673—0887(2011)03—0007—06. Retrieved 2022-10-10.

Jin, Lizao (2008-6). "常州话绅谈与街谈之离合融变(The Fusion of Gently Talk and Street Talk of Changzhou Dialect)". Journal of Changzhou Institute of Technology(Social Science Edition). Vol. 26 No.3. ISSN:1673一0887(2008)03—0075一04. Retrieved 2022-10-10.

Zhong, Min (2018-2). "常州方言四字格俗成语释例(An Annotated Exemplification of the Four-character Folk Idioms in Changzhou Dialect)". Journal of Jiangsu University of Technology. Vol. 24 No.1. ISSN: 2095-7394（2018）01-0039-07. Retrieved 2022-10-10.

Zhang, lv (2019-03). "常州方言对常州普通话语音的影响(The Influence of Changzhou Dialect on the Pronunciation of Changzhou Putonghua)". Journal of Jinling Institute of Technology(Social Science). Vol. 33 No.1. ISSN: 1673—131X(2019)01—0061一04. Retrieved 2022-10-10.

External links 
Wu Association

Wu Chinese
Changzhou